Life Begins at 17 is a 1958 American drama film starring Dorothy Johnson, Mark Damon, Edd Byrnes and Luana Anders.

Plot
Carol Peck, a 17-year-old from Indiana, has an older sister, Elaine, who is a beauty queen. Carol wins a local pageant, to the delight of her parents Virginia and Harry and her dependable, mild-mannered boyfriend, Jim.

A smug, prep-school boy, Russ Lippincott, openly declares during the beauty contest his intention to date the winner. Elaine is intrigued, but declines. Russ is determined to make a conquest, so he uses her little sister Carol, pretending to be interested in her instead. Elaine wins the title of Miss Indianapolis, then takes up with Russ, insisting he tell Carol the truth.

A misunderstanding leads to a false assumption that Russ and Carol have been intimate, compounded by a broken-hearted Carol claiming she is pregnant. Russ is threatened with expulsion from school and possible arrest for sex with a minor. When she confesses her lie, Carol wins newfound respect from Russ, who becomes genuinely interested in her while Elaine returns to Jim.

Cast
 Dorothy Johnson as Elaine Peck
 Mark Damon as Russ Lippincott
 Edd Byrnes as Jim Parker
 Luana Anders as Carol Peck
 Ann Doran as Virginia Peck
 Hugh Sanders as Harry Peck

Production
It was known as The Teenage Story during production.

References

External links

1958 films
Columbia Pictures films
American drama films
1958 drama films
Films directed by Arthur Dreifuss
1950s English-language films
1950s American films